Shargacucullia scrophulariae, the water betony, is a moth of the family Noctuidae. It is found throughout Europe, east to Turkey.

Technical description and variation

C. scrophulariae Cap. (27 h). Not quite so broad as verbasci, the forewing paler and duller in coloration; the dark brown costal streak overlaid with grey and so paler than those on inner margin; the ground colour below median hardly paler, not strikingly whitish; hindwing much as in verbasci. The wingspan is about 45 mm.

Biology
The moth flies from May to August depending on the location.

The larvae feed on Scrophularia umbrosa, Scrophularia nodosa, Scrophularia auriculata, Scrophularia canina, Verbascum lychnitis and Verbascum thapsus.

Similar species
Shargacucullia scrophulariae is difficult to certainly distinguish from these congeners. See Townsend et al.
Shargacucullia verbasci (Linnaeus, 1758)
Shargacucullia lychnitis (Rambur, 1833)

References

External links

 Water Betony (Cucullia scrophulariae) on UKmoths
 Fauna Europaea Cucullia (Shargacucullia) scrophulariae (Denis & Schiffermüller, 1775)
 Lepiforum.de

Cuculliinae
Moths of Europe
Moths of Asia
Taxa named by Michael Denis
Taxa named by Ignaz Schiffermüller